Believed is the third and final album by American pop singer-songwriter, actor Jamie Walters with his band, Elco. It was released through indie label Leisure Records.

Track listing
"Evilyn" (Jamie Walters) – 4:29
"Just Like You" (Jamie Walters) – 3:04
"Butter" (Jamie Walters) – 5:14
"Catch Me" (Jamie Walters) – 5:16
"5ive" (Jamie Walters) – 4:31
"Better Off Dead" (Jamie Walters) – 3:54
"Such a Drag" (Jamie Walters) – 4:22
"Marooned" (Jamie Walters) – 3:48
"Sparkling Light" (Jamie Walters) – 4:28
"Wonderland" (Ian Spencer, Jamie Walters) – 3:58
"Superman" (Ian Spencer, Jamie Walters) – 4:45

Personnel 
Louis Allen – arranger, string bass
Joe Fischer – executive producer
Ronan Chris Murphy – producer, mixing
Jamie Walters – guitar, vocals, producer

External links

2002 albums
Jamie Walters albums